Fujihara (written: 藤原) is a Japanese surname and a place name, which may refer to:

Fujihara, Tochigi (Fujihara-machi), a town
, Japanese kickboxer and Muay Thai fighter
Masanori Fujihara (born 1988), Japanese professional baseball pitcher
Tsutomu Fujihara (born 1980), former Japanese football player

See also
 Fujiwara (disambiguation) (藤原), a heteronym

Japanese-language surnames